Michiel van der Heijden (born 3 January 1992 in Den Bosch) is a Dutch mountain biker and Cyclo Cross Rider. From 2007 until 2010 he raced for the Merida-Combee mountain bike team, now he is racing for the Rabobank cycling team.
Van der Heijden won a silver medal for mountain biking in the 2009 European Championships in Zoetermeer, and a bronze medal at the Europeans in 2010 in Haifa. In 2011 he became Dutch National Champion for the 9th time. 
In 2010 van der Heijden became World Champion XCO juniors in Mont-Sainte-Anne, Canada, making him the second Dutch XCO World Champion after Bart Brentjens. He was on the start list for the 2018 Cross-country European Championship and he finished

References

1992 births
Living people
Dutch male cyclists
Dutch mountain bikers
Cross-country mountain bikers
Cyclo-cross cyclists
Sportspeople from 's-Hertogenbosch
European Games competitors for the Netherlands
Cyclists at the 2015 European Games
Cyclists from North Brabant
21st-century Dutch people